Anna Klingmann (born 1965) is a German architect, author and academic who specializes in branding. She is the founder and principal architect of Klingmann Architects and Brand Consultants, and author of Brandscapes: Architecture in the Experience Economy. Klingmann coined the term "brandism" which describes how architecture can communicate a company's brand to the public. Her description of brandism can also be used not just to describe single structures; entire cities can have a unique brand or "expression of identity." She also has described the concept of a "brandscape" which describes corporate value systems embodied into the physical landscape. Klingmann believes that branded landscapes "effect lasting, meaningful changes that draw upon the dormant or explicit potential of particular cultures and places."

Klingmann moved to New York City in 1984 and went to the Parson's School of Design. She earned her architecture degrees from Pratt Institute, the Architectural Association in London and the Berlin University of the Arts.

Klingmann's main influence is Louis Kahn. Other influences include Zaha Hadid and Rem Koolhaas. In 2007, she worked for the architecture firm, Gensler, to help on two large-scale projects. In 2014, she began a collaborative project with the University and the Saudi Commission for Tourism and Antiquities (SCTA) which looks to connect artists, scientists, curators, and others with the history and culture of Asir.

Klingmann is currently the architecture department chair at Dar Al-Hekma University. She has previously taught at Cornell University and Columbia University.

References

External links 
 Official site

1965 births
Living people
21st-century German architects
German women architects
Academic staff of Dar Al-Hekma University
Pratt Institute alumni
21st-century German women